English Vinglish is a 2012 Indian Hinglish-language comedy-drama film written and directed by Gauri Shinde. The film stars Sridevi as Shashi Godbole, a small entrepreneur who makes snacks. Shashi enrolls in an English-speaking course to stop her husband and daughter mocking her lack of English skills and gains self-respect in the process. Shashi was written by Shinde, inspired by her mother. The film marked Sridevi's return to filmmaking after a 15-year hiatus post Judaai (1997); it also features Adil Hussain, French actor Mehdi Nebbou, and Priya Anand. Amitabh Bachchan makes a cameo appearance in Hindi, whose portions are reshot for the Tamil-dubbed version with Ajith Kumar replacing him.

English Vinglish premiered at the 2012 Toronto International Film Festival, where it received a 5-minute standing ovation Before its release, the film was screened for the Indian press and critics. The film was released theatrically on 5 October 2012. It received universal critical acclaim, with reviewers raving Shinde's direction and screenplay, Sridevi's performance as well as the film's soundtrack and cinematography.

English Vinglish won all of the Best Debut Director awards of 2012 for Gauri Shinde. It was shortlisted as India's official entry for the Academy Awards in the Best Foreign Language Film category. The film earned global acclaim at several international festivals and Sridevi was hailed as the "Meryl Streep of India" and the "female Rajinikanth in India".

Plot 
Shashi Godbole is an Indian homemaker who makes and sells laddoos as a home-run business. Her husband Satish and daughter Sapna take her for granted, mock her because she doesn't speak much English, and generally treat her with disrespect, making Shashi feel negative and insecure. However, her young son, Sagar loves her as she is, and her mother-in-law offers her words of sympathy.

Shashi's older sister Manu, who lives in New York City, invites Shashi's family to her daughter Meera's wedding to Kevin. It is decided that Shashi will go to New York alone 5 weeks before the wedding to help Manu organize. Her husband and children will join her as the wedding approaches. During her flight to New York, Shashi is given inspirational advice by a fellow passenger. While Shashi is in New York, she has a traumatic experience at a café where the waitress is rude to her due to her inability to communicate in English. She is comforted by a French chef Laurent who happened to be queuing up behind her at the café as he himself is weak in English.

Using the money she made from selling laddoos, Shashi secretly enrolls in a conversational English class that offers to teach the language in 4 weeks, showing her resourcefulness at navigating an unfamiliar city alone. The class comprises the instructor David Fischer, a Mexican nanny Eva, a Pakistani cab driver Salman Khan, a Chinese hairstylist Yu Song, a Tamil software engineer Ramamurthy, a closeted African-Caribbean man Udumbke, and Laurent, whom she had met earlier. Shashi quickly becomes a promising and committed student, earns everyone's respect with her charming behavior and her cuisine, and gains self-confidence. Laurent becomes attracted to Shashi, leading to some interpersonal drama.

Meanwhile, Shashi's niece Radha who is Meera's younger sister finds out about her secret English classes and is supportive of her pursuit. Shashi starts watching English films at night and does her homework assiduously. To complete the English-speaking course and get an academic certificate, each student must write and deliver a 5-minute speech. Shashi's family joins her in New York earlier than planned, to surprise her. Shashi tries to continue attending class but decides to quit because of scheduling conflicts. The test date coincides with that of the wedding, forcing Shashi to miss the test.

Radha invites Fischer and the entire class to the wedding, where Satish is taken aback at being introduced to a diverse group of people by his wife. Shashi gives a touching and enlightening toast to the married couple in English, surprising everyone who knew her as a typical, conservative, Indian homemaker. In her speech, Shashi extols the virtues being married and having a family, describing the family as a safe space of love and respect where weaknesses are not mocked. Satish and Sapna regret treating her with disrespect. Fischer declares that she has passed the course with distinction and issues her the certificate. Shashi thanks Laurent for making her feel better about herself. Shashi and her family return to India.

Cast 

 Sridevi as Shashi Godbole: Satish's wife. Sapna and Sagar's mother
 Adil Hussain as Satish Godbole, Shashi's husband
 Mehdi Nebbou as Laurent, Shashi's classmate. He gets Attracted to Shashi
 Priya Anand as Radha, Shashi's niece, Meera's sister and Manu's second daughter
 Navika Kotia as Sapna Godbole, Shashi's daughter
 Shivansh Kotia as Sagar Godbole, Shashi's son
 Sujata Kumar as Manu, Shashi's sister, Meera and Radha's mother
 Cory Hibbs as David Fischer, Shashi's teacher
 Ruth Aguilar as Eva, Shashi's classmate
 Sumeet Vyas as Salman Khan, Shashi's classmate
 Rajeev Ravindranathan as Ramamurthy, Shashi's classmate
 Damian Thompson as Udumbke, Shashi's classmate
 Maria Romano as Yu Son, Shashi's classmate
 Neelu Sodhi as Meera, Shashi's niece, Radha's sister and Manu's first daughter
 Ross Nathan as Kevin, Meera's fiance
 Maria Pendolino as Jennifer
 Sulabha Deshpande as Mrs. Godbole, Shashi's mother-in-law
 Ashvin Mathew as Father Vincent, Sapna's teacher at school

Cameo appearances
 Amitabh Bachchan as Shashi's co-passenger on flight (Hindi version)
 Ajith Kumar  as a Shashi's co-passenger on flight (Tamil version)

Production

Development 

The story was inspired by Shinde's mother, a Marathi-speaking woman who ran a pickle business at her house in Pune. Her mother was not fluent in English, which embarrassed Shinde as a child. In an interview, Shinde said, "I made this film to say sorry to my mother." The film started development in 2011 or earlier, and several plot points and cameo appearances were decided early on. English Vinglish garnered much media coverage because of Sridevi's comeback after nearly 15 years away from film production.

English Vinglish also marked the Bollywood debut of South Indian actress Priya Anand, who previously worked in the Tamil and Telugu film industries. It is the directorial debut of Gauri Shinde, who previously worked as an advertisement filmmaker. It was shot mostly in New York. The principal photography concluded in October 2011 and it was released in Hindi and Tamil. It was later dubbed into Telugu.

Ajith Kumar performed the cameo appearance without receiving payment. He even flew in for the shooting at his own cost.

Promotion 
The first preview of English Vinglish was launched on 14 June 2012. The official distributor Eros International posted the preview video and poster on YouTube and Twitter. A 2-minute teaser showing Sridevi reading the Censor Certificate of the film in deliberately broken English was also released. The preview received positive response and was lauded for its unique and fresh concept. The full theatrical trailer was unveiled at a special media event on 13 August 2012 coinciding with Sridevi's birthday. It received a positive response and went viral on YouTube, exceeding one million views in a week. Sridevi's performance in the trailer was highly acclaimed by her fans and the media; the Hindustan Times said, "Sridevi casts a spell in English Vinglish!"

The Tamil and Telugu theatrical trailers were subsequently released in Chennai and Hyderabad respectively. Sridevi also appeared on Kaun Banega Crorepati with Gauri Shinde and on the dance show Jhalak Dikhhla Jaa.

Soundtrack 
The soundtrack and background music were composed by Amit Trivedi and the lyrics were written by Pa. Vijay for the Tamil version, Swanand Kirkire for the Hindi, and Krishna Chaitanya for the Telugu versions respectively. The album comprises six songs including a male and a female version of the title track "English Vinglish". Both the versions of the soundtrack was released on 1 September 2012, in Mumbai, Chennai and Hyderabad.

Track list

Critical reception 

IBNlive.in rated the soundtrack 3.5/5 stating, "Although the English Vinglish album lacks the lustre of new age Bollywood albums, it manages to leave the listener smiling with its simple approach. There are no remixes and nothing out-of-the-box here, but it delights." BBC reviewed the soundtrack as "Having delivered hit albums like Ishaqzaade, Ek Main Aur Ekk Tu and Dev.D, Trivedi proves here that he’s a talent unafraid of experimenting. He stands on the verge of big success." Glamsham rated 3.5/5 for the album. Joginder Tuteja of Bollywood Hungama rated 3 out of 5 stars stating, "The music of English Vinglish does well in creating added perception about the film and only lends further weight to this Sridevi-starrer. In fact it won't be wrong to say that the soundtrack does its job in exciting a listener to check out what the film is about. Though most of the songs are situational, which means their shelf life would be restricted till the film's run in theatres, none associated with English Vinglish can be expected to mind that as this Amit Trivedi and Swanand Kirkire soundtrack ensures that there are many forward steps taken here."

BollywoodLife rated 3 out of 5 stars stating "The music is situational and an integral part of the movie. English Vinglish is sweet-weet, cool-shool and fun-vun! Give it a listen!" Koimoi rated 3 out of 5 stars "Overall, the music of the album is good with varied shades of emotions that include colors of celebration and ‘masti’. Despite lacking a commercial chartbuster, the album still does well in holding your attention with Swanand Kirkire's lyrics aptly supporting compositions by Amit Trivedi." BizAsia Live rated the album 8 out of 10 stating, "Director Shinde has made a number of correct decisions to deliver English Vinglish for her first movie. Apart from the story angle and choosing Sridevi as the leading lady, believing in the talent of Trivedi and Kirkire is the biggest blessing for her. For a niche and offbeat non-commercial project like this, the soundtrack should not have been commercial either to match the overall feel of the movie. Trivedi once again stamps his innovative genius all over this six-track album with great contribution to the vocals as well. Rao and Chauhan are the other 2 superstars for this female lead movie. The music might not deliver well on the international music charts but if one has an ear for good music, this is a must-buy album with a global sound. 'Navrai Majhi', 'English Vinglish' and 'Dhak Dhuk' are the picks to sample great talent, variety and maturity in Indian music."

Music Aloud rated the album 7/10 stating "Not in the same league as Ishaqzaade or his Coke Studio episode, but a neat score from Amit Trivedi, led from the front by 'Gustakh Dil' and 'Dhak Dhuk'." Milliblog reviewed it as a competent soundtrack from Amit Trivedi.

Release

Screenings at international film festivals 
In July 2012, English Vinglish was selected by the 2012 Toronto International Film Festival (TIFF) and scheduled for a world premiere at the coveted Galas section of the festival. Sridevi's comeback made it a highly anticipated film and all shows at TIFF sold out during advance booking. The premiere took place at the Roy Thomson Auditorium on 14 September and was attended by Sridevi, Mehdi Nebbou, R. Balki, Gauri Shinde and other members of the cast and crew. At the end of the premiere, the full-house audience gave a 10-minute standing ovation.

After the Toronto premiere, some international media outlets hailed Sridevi as the "Meryl Streep of India". 2 weeks later, America's entertainment weekly Variety wrote in its review of English Vinglish that it found Sridevi "[d]isarmingly charming in a manner that recalls Audrey Hepburn." English Vinglish was selected to be showcased in December 2012 at the Marrakech International Film Festival; it was screened to an audience of around 15,000 viewers and was attended by Sridevi, Shinde, Balki and Nebbou.

In February 2013, English Vinglish was screened at the 63rd Berlin International Film Festival as part of Indo-German Film Week. Shinde conducted a screenwriting workshop and spoke about the film and women's rights in India.

The film had its US premiere at the 36th Portland International Film Festival. Writer and critic David D. Levine praised the film, saying "[t]hough it's not a musical, strictly speaking, there's quite a bit of music and dance, and the film is laugh-out-loud funny and heart-rending by turns ... My favorite film of this PIFF. 5 stars out of 5." In April 2013, English Vinglish was selected to play at the third Beijing International Film Festival and the International Film Festival of Panama. In May the same year, it won the 'Best Visiting Artist' award at the San Diego Film Festival. Andrew Friedenberg, director of the Cinema Society of San Diego announced that English Vinglish "dominated the voting".

Indian premiere 

The Indian premiere of English Vinglish was held on 4 October 2012 and was one of the biggest premieres of that year It was organized as a red carpet event to celebrate Sridevi's return to filmmaking, and some famous Bollywood personalities attended, including directors Yash Chopra, Ramesh Sippy, Rajkumar Hirani and Ashutosh Gowariker and actors Amitabh Bachchan, Anil Kapoor, Vidya Balan, Sonakshi Sinha, Bipasha Basu, Tabu, Shilpa Shetty, Konkona Sen Sharma, Madhuri Dixit, Ayesha Takia, Kangana Ranaut and Javed Akhtar.

Theatrical release 
After Eros International's efforts to release the film on 21 September 2012, English Vinglish had its worldwide theatrical release on 5 October 2012. The Hindi version was released across 739 screens, while the Tamil and Telugu versions were released on 110 and 47 screens respectively. It was released in over 250 screens overseas.

World television premiere 
On 29 December 2012, English Vinglish saw one of the biggest world television premieres on Zee Cinema. The premiere was conducted as a high-profile event, and Zee TV arranged a special press conference attended by Sridevi and Gauri Shinde. To publicize the premiere, the channel launched a free English-speaking module telephone service using IVRS, which was a success with over 25,000 calls from across India in less than a week. English Vinglish-styled signs, including 'Exit-Vexit', 'Coffee Voffee' and 'Switch off Mobile-Vobile', were posted at 900 touch-points in cafes, malls, multiplexes and airports. Zee Cinema formed partnerships with Cafe Coffee Day, Inox, Fame, Lifestyle, Shoppers Stop, Globus and Westside to market the premiere. Mohan Gopinath, business head of Zee Cinema said, "More than 2 generations of India have worshiped Sridevi. Add to that an extremely simple yet heart-warming narrative, some spot-on direction by Gauri Shinde, Balki's unmistakable touch and you have a winner on your hands."

Box office 

In India
The film performed well in large cities, earning  on its first day of release. The gross went to 125% and the total figures for 2 days were  The Sunday figures were even higher; collections increased by 200% and English Vinglish ended its first weekend with  net. The film ended its first week earning  net.

Despite new releases Aiyyaa, Bhoot Returns and Student of the Year, the film's box office revenues remained steady. At the end of its second week, its revenue exceeded . Lifetime earnings for the film in India stand at over  net, and  gross. English Vinglish ran for 50 days in theatres.

Outside India 
The film opened to a revenue of  overseas, bringing its worldwide total to  net in 2012. The film entered the UK box office top 10, as of 13 October 2012. The film performed well overseas, collecting record figures unheard of for a heroine-oriented film. It grossed  in the United States and Canada, and £464,508 in the United Kingdom. In Nigeria, the film grossed US$842,330.English Vinglish created box office history in Hong Kong in May 2013, becoming the second biggest Bollywood hit in the territory after Aamir Khan's 3 Idiots (2009). It earned the distinction of being screened at Hong Kong's Director's Club: a privilege usually reserved for the best and most celebrated films in the world. English Vinglish grossed  in Hong Kong. English Vinglish also created waves in Japan when it was first premiered in 2014. It outperformed most other films and became the second highest-grossing Hindi film in Japan, earning around $1.4 million. The film is second only to 3 Idiots which had collected . It got an overwhelming response and Sridevi was hailed as the 'Female Rajinikanth of Japan'. It also grossed US$300,000 in Taiwan, making it the second biggest Bollywood film there after 3 Idiots. In South Korea, the film drew a box office audience of 31,334 viewers in 2014, grossing .

 Reception English Vinglish received widespread critical acclaim upon release, with reviewers praising Shinde's screenplay and direction, Sridevi's performance as well as the film's soundtrack and cinematography. The Times of India gave it 4 out of 5, calling it "[e]asily one of the best films of 2012 ... [Sridevi's] performance is a masterclass for actors ... Request you to make a little place next to you, Rajkumar Hirani; Gauri Shinde has taken a bow in mainstream Bollywood." Aniruddha Guha of Daily News and Analysis also gave 4 out of 5 and said it is "among the most refreshingly novel films made in recent times ... If you're a Sridevi fan, you can't miss it. If you aren't, you still can't miss it."

Another 4 out of 5 came from Raja Sen of Rediff, who called it "a winner all the way" and wrote "Sridevi excels in fleshing out her character." Taran Adarsh also scored it 4 out of 5 and called it "a remarkable motion picture ... A must-watch for every parent, every child. Strongly recommended!" Critic Subhash K Jha gave a 4.5 rating, and wrote that Sridevi "makes the contemporary actresses, even the coolest ones, look like jokes ... If you watch only 2 films every year make sure you see English Vinglish twice!" Rajeev Masand of CNN-IBN gave it 3.5, and said that Sridevi delivers "a performance that is nothing short of perfect ... It's warm and fuzzy, and leaves you with a big smile on your face." IMDb gave the film a score of eight out of ten.

Firstpost's Rubina Khan gave 5 out of 5, saying "Sridevi brings acting back in English Vinglish". Komal Nahta said the film was "beyond stars" and said Sridevi "makes the best comeback in Bollywood history and delivers a landmark performance". Social movie rating site MOZVO gave it 4.3 out of 5. Peter Bradshaw of The Guardian, gave it 3 out of 5, and called it "[a]n undemanding picture that goes down as well as the heroine's tasty laddoos".

Kate Taylor of The Globe and Mail gave it 2 out of 4 and wrote: "One wonders how long the neglectful Satish will remember the message of equality and gratitude if it is delivered as gently as this movie does." Amer Shoib of The Cinema Journal gave it 4/5 and called the film, "a hilarious, touching, sensitive, and sweet film that marks the triumphant come back of India's biggest female star...Sridevi." Indian columnist Shobha De tweeted, "Paresh Rawal and SrideviActors of the Year! The rest are just successful stars!" and wrote a column titled 'What is that something about Sridevi?' UTV Stars called it the "Mother India of our times".The Hollywood Reporter also gave a glowing review, and said, "Indian screen legend Sridevi triumphs in a gentle, but affecting, story of a woman's awakening self-respect ... It's no surprise that by the end of the film, Shashi will conquer her fears, but the route Shinde takes to get her there is distinctively Shashi's. The image of the newly-confident Shashi striding down a Manhattan street, a takeout coffee in hand and a trench coat belted over her sari, will make you smile days after you leave the theater ... Ultimately, what make English Vinglish memorable are the small, step-by-step choices Shashi makes to transforms herself. Yes, there's grit there, but it's tempered with compassion and dignity. The way the character has been crafted by Shinde, and interpreted by Sridevi, is gloriously feminine, and uniquely Indian." Amazon Prime Video rated it 7.8 out of 10 and stated: "The challenges of an ordinary middle class woman who is not proficient with the English language, and how she overcomes them."

AccoladesEnglish Vinglish garnered awards and nominations in a variety of categories, with particular praise for its direction and Sridevi's performance. At the 58th Filmfare Awards, English Vinglish received 4 nominations, including Best Film and Best Actress (Sridevi) and won Best Debut Director (Shinde). Sridevi received Best Actress nominations at several awards ceremonies, which apart from Filmfare include IIFA, Screen, Zee Cine, and Star Guild Awards. At the 11th Stardust Awards, the film earned 5 nominations, going on to win Best Drama Actress (Sridevi) and Best Debut Director (Shinde.

 Impact 
With English Vinglish, Sridevi made a successful comeback after a long hiatus. Box Office Capsule hailed the film and Sridevi's return as "Golden Comeback of the Queen." Sridevi was ranked No.1 on many year-end lists, including:

 Rediff's "Top 10 Bollywood Actresses of 2012" for giving a "performance younger actresses, including the ones on this list, should learn from."
 CNN-IBN's list of "Top 10 Bollywood Actresses of 2012" for a performance that "overshadowed young actresses".
 Yahoo's "Top Ten Actresses of 2012" for "winning the hearts of millions of middle-class housewives".
 Box Office Capsule's "Top 10 Bollywood Actresses of 2012" for "conquering hearts as well as the box-office".
 Bollyspice's "Top 10 Bollywood Actresses of 2012" for "making us fall under her spell all over again".
 Buzzine's "Top 5 Bollywood Actors of 2012" list for returning with "grace and elegance".

Sridevi won the "Vuclip Icons of 2012" mobile survey to be voted as the Most Admired Actress of Bollywood. Her performance created an enormous impact when Amitabh Bachchan said in his blog that Sridevi's heart-rending acting in English Vinglish moved him to tears leaving "collective lumps in the throat". A poll by BollywoodLife declared Sridevi as the "Most Powerful Actress in B-Town", winning by a landslide 75% votes over all the current actresses.

The actress was featured as one of the Top Newsmakers of 2012 by NDTV and Filmfare. Filmfare listed Sridevi as the "Top Game Changer of 2012" for making "a hit comeback after getting married and mothering 2 kids". Reuters' list stated that "Sridevi, in her comeback movie, outshone any actress in any role this year and proved once again that you don't need a male star to make a good Bollywood film", while India Today said, "Sridevi was reinvented in a role of substance". MTV wrote, "when an actor of Sridevi's calibre breaks her 15-year hiatus, you can be sure she has a winner in tow".

Since its worldwide success, English Vinglish consistently appeared on media outlets' Best Films of the Year lists. It was ranked first on the Times of Indias list of "Top 10 Films of 2012", which compared Gauri Shinde's directorial debut with veterans Manoj Kumar, Gulzar and Aparna Sen. It featured in "Best Bollywood Films of 2012" by Reuters, "Bollywood's Most Appreciated Films of 2012" by IBN Live, 'Top Bollywood Movies of 2012' by India Today, "Best Films of 2012" list by Rediff and Forbes "Best of Bollywood 2012". The film ranked third on MTV's "Top 5 Movies of 2012". It ranked #2 on Raja Sen's "Ten Best Films of 2012" and 4th on Rajeev Masand's list of "Top 5 Hits of 2012". The café scene in the film ranked #2 on CNN-IBN's list of "Top 10 Bollywood's Best Scenes of 2012". English Vinglish, particularly Sridevi's character in the film, was noted for inspiring Dalit girls in Bihar to master the English language. Filmfare listed it as one of the fifteen strongest women characters in Bollywood. Radhika Seth and Riya Dhankar of Vogue India listed it as one of the most empowering female characters in Bollywood. Srishti Magan of ScoopWhoop listed it as one of the nineteen most relatable female characters from Bollywood.

Director Gauri Shinde featured in the Financial Times 2012 list of "25 Indians To Watch". She also featured on Rediff's list of "Bollywood's 5 Best Directors of 2012".

 Oscar shortlist 

In September 2013, English Vinglish'' was considered for being shortlisted for the Indian submission for the Academy Award for Best Foreign Language Film.

References

External links 

 
 
 

2012 films
2012 comedy-drama films
Films directed by Gauri Shinde
2010s Hindi-language films
Indian multilingual films
Indian feminist films
Indian comedy-drama films
Films about women in India
Films scored by Amit Trivedi
2012 directorial debut films
Indian films set in New York City
Films about language